The Carroll Avenue bridge may be:

 Kinzie Street railroad bridge in Chicago
 Carroll Avenue bridge (Maryland), part of Maryland Route 195

See also
 Carroll Street Bridge